The European Journal of Gastroenterology & Hepatology is a peer reviewed medical journal covering the fields of gastroenterology and hepatology. It was established in 1989 and is published by Lippincott Williams & Wilkins. The editors-in-chief are Joost PH Drenth (Radboud University Medical Center) and Didier Lebrec. According to the Journal Citation Reports, the journal has a 2020 impact factor of 2.251.

References

External links

Gastroenterology and hepatology journals
Lippincott Williams & Wilkins academic journals
Monthly journals
Publications established in 1989
English-language journals